Unity FC may refer to:

 Unity FC (Canada), a Canadian soccer team
 Unity FC (Ghana), a Ghanaian football team
 Unity FC (England), a defunct English football team